Euchrysops horus is a butterfly in the family Lycaenidae. It is found in Kenya.

References

Butterflies described in 1938
Euchrysops